Min Sang-Gi (born 27 August 1991) is a South Korean football midfielder who plays for Suwon Samsung Bluewings.

Club career 
Min joined Suwon Samsung Bluewings in 2010.

References

External links

Living people
1991 births
Association football midfielders
South Korean footballers
Suwon Samsung Bluewings players
K League 1 players